Vecherniy Stavropol (The Evening Stavropol) is a newspaper published in Stavropol, Russia since 1989.  It comes out five days a week, Tuesday through Saturday.

The circulation, as of 2007, is 25,473, except on Thursday, when it is 31,571.  The editor-in-chief, as of 2007, is Mr. Mikhail Y. Vasilenko.

External links
Official site

Newspapers published in the Soviet Union
Newspapers established in 1989
Russian-language newspapers published in Russia
Stavropol